F10 is a startup incubator and accelerator founded in 2016 focused on Fintech, Insurtech, Regtech and Deeptech. Its incubation and acceleration programs help startups in connecting with entrepreneurs, experts, mentors, and investors for early stage venture and late stage venture investing. The company was founded in Zurich and currently has operating hubs in Zurich, Singapore, Madrid, and Barcelona.

History
In 2014, SIX (Switzerland's stock exchange) launched a new project to accelerate their innovation process which grew into F10 and it was formally launched as FinTech Startup Incubator / Accelerator in August 2015 by Markus Graf and Andreas Iten. F10 launched the 6-month “Prototype to Product” P2 program and held its first program in July 2017 in which 14 startups were selected from 260 international teams from the financial, insurance and regulatory technology sector. Since then, more than 200 startups have gone through F10 programs. F10 corporate partners  include SIX, Julius Bär, Generali Switzerland, BME Bolsas y Mercados Españoles, Renta 4, R3, TX Group, Hewlett Packard Enterprise, Franklin Templeton, Klaytn, and Microsoft Switzerland.  Notable alumni companies include Yokoy, Apiax, PXL Vision, Futurae exeon, FQX, Relio, and Stableton.

Structure
Early-stage startups can apply for the F10 Flagship Incubation program in Zurich, Singapore, and Madrid and their viability is judged by the Country head and startup coaches of the program, in which startups will be supported in transitioning their prototype to a sellable product.  Any type of startup in FinTech, InsurTech, RegTech, DeepTech or any other tech applicable to the financial industry can apply. Examples from their inaugural Singaporean cohort range from tokenized asset management (DEXTF, Tokenomatic) to KYC (Notarum) to online payments (Maesh).

Growth-stage startups (post-seed, post-revenue) startups can apply to F10 Acceleration challenges launched by F10 corporate partners in Zurich, Singapore and Madrid to accelerate collaborations (pilots, PoCs).

Countries 
In 2020, F10 expanded internationally into Singapore by launching its Incubation program. In September of that year, F10 also announced that it would set up locations in Spain (both Madrid and Barcelona).

References

Mentorships
Startup accelerators